Ierakas is a small village built along a natural fjord on the south east coast of Laconia, Greece. It is part of the municipal unit of Zarakas.  Ierakas is famous for its port or limani, providing docks for yachts and boats. The port village includes a hotel, restaurants, taverns and cafés, popular for their fresh fish and seafood throughout the year. The limani is also the location of the ruins of the ancient town of Zarax.

References

External links
Ierakas
Porto Cadena

Populated places in Laconia
Monemvasia